Alpha-actinin-1 is a protein that in humans is encoded by the ACTN1 gene.

Function 

Alpha actinins belong to the spectrin gene superfamily which represents a diverse group of cytoskeletal proteins, including the alpha and beta spectrins and dystrophins.  Alpha-actinin-1 is an F-actin cross-linking protein – a bundling protein that is thought to anchor actin to a number of intracellular structures. Alpha-actinin-1 is a non-muscle cytoskeletal isoform found along microfilament bundles and adherens-type junctions, where it is involved in binding actin to the membrane.  In contrast, skeletal, cardiac, and smooth muscle isoforms are localized to the Z-disc and analogous dense bodies, where they help anchor the myofibrillar actin filaments.

Interactions
Alpha-actinin-1 has been shown to interact with:
 CDK5R1,
 CDK5R2,
 Collagen, type XVII, alpha 1,
 GIPC1,
 PDLIM1,
 Protein kinase N1,
 SSX2IP, and
 Zyxin.
PTPRT (PTPrho)

See also
 Actinin

References

Further reading

External links
 Actinin, alpha 1 Info with links in the Cell Migration Gateway
 

EF-hand-containing proteins